Fundamentalist is a studio album by Russell Morris released in May 2007. It captures a collection of material performed solo/acoustic by Russell Morris, including his two no.1 singles, "The Real Thing" and "Part Three into Paper Walls". 
As of 2013, the album has sold around 8,000 copies in Australia.

Review
Bruce Elder of Sydney Morning Herald said this album has "impressive acoustic version[s]" of "Wings of an Eagle", "Sweet, Sweet Love", "The Real Thing" and "Part Three into Paper Walls" and complimented the "remarkably intense and personal reading of Bob Dylan's 'It's All Over Now, Baby Blue' and a suitably chugging reading of Lennon-McCartney's 'I Am The Walrus. Elder concluded the review with: "He has been constantly touring for the past 11 years and the experience of the road produces versions of the songs that, in some instances, are little short of amazing. 'The Real Thing', when backed by little more than an acoustic guitar, sounds as good as the original piece of pop psychedelia."

Track listing
 "1000 Suns" – 4:43
 "Wings of an Eagle" – 4:02
 "Sweet, Sweet Love" – 4:20
 "Mr America" – 3:19
 "It's All Over Now, Baby Blue" – 3:53
 "Keeping My Distance" – 3:46
 "As Long As It Takes" – 2:38
 "The Girl That I Love"	 – 3:45
 "Over You" – 3:32
 "Hush"	 – 4:45
 "As Far As I Can Remember" – 3:42
 "I am the Walrus" – 3:44
 "The Real Thing" – 4:34
 "Part Three into Paper Walls" – 6:08
 "Morning Song" 4:01  (silent track)

Credits
 Drums – Kevin Murphy 
 Guitar, Vocals, Bass, Keyboards – Peter Robinson 
 Harmonica – Jim Keays

Release history

References

External links
 

2007 albums
Liberation Records albums
Russell Morris albums